The Ohio Heritage Conference is an OHSAA athletic league whose members are located in the Ohio counties of Champaign, Clark, Madison, Greene and Union. The league was established in the fall of 2001.

Current Members 

* Fairbanks and Madison Plains joined the Ohio Heritage Conference in the winter of 2016.

Membership Timeline

History 
The Ohio Heritage Conference was established in 2001 with the charter schools being Catholic Central, Cedarville, Greeneview, Mechanicsburg, Northeastern, Southeastern, Triad and West Liberty-Salem.

In 2015, the OHC announced that Fairbanks and Madison Plains would join the conference.  Both schools officially joined the conference for the winter sports season in 2016.

In 2016, the OHC announced that Greenon and West Jefferson would join the conference.  Both schools officially joined the conference for the fall sports season in 2017.

Sponsored Sports 
The OHC supports 23 league sports for both male and female competition.

League champions for each sport are recognized in both the North Division and South Division.

OHC All-Sports Championships 
Below is a list of the OHC school(s) that has been awarded the most conference championships (all sports) each year:

Below is a list of OHC Championships won by each member school since the OHC's inception.

State Championships

Conference Rivalries 
West Liberty-Salem vs Mechanicsburg (since 1929, consecutively since 1964)

West Liberty-Salem vs Triad

Triad vs Mechanicsburg

Cedarville vs Greeneview

Cedarville vs Southeastern

Southeastern vs Greeneview

West Jefferson vs Madison Plains

West Jefferson vs Mechanicsburg

Greenon vs Catholic Central

External links 
 https://www.ohcsports.com/
 http://ohcsports.com/content/constitution.pdf

References 

Sports organizations established in 2001
High school sports in Ohio
2001 establishments in Ohio
High school sports associations in the United States